Montandon is a census-designated place located in West Chillisquaque Township, Northumberland County in the state of Pennsylvania, United States.  The community is located near the West Branch Susquehanna River at the intersections of Pennsylvania Routes 147 and 45, roughly halfway between the boroughs of Northumberland and Milton.  As of the 2010 census the population was 903 residents.

Demographics

References

Census-designated places in Northumberland County, Pennsylvania
Census-designated places in Pennsylvania